This is a list of the Ultra prominent peaks (with topographic prominence greater than 1,500 metres) in Central Asia. The list is divided topographically rather than politically. There are 75 in total; 21 in the Pamirs, 1 in the Karakum, 5 in the Alays, 24 in the Tian Shan and 24 in the Altai and Mongolia.

Karakum Desert

Pamir Mountains

Pamir-Alay

Tian Shan

Altai region and Mongolia

Sources
 List - Central Asian Republics
 List - Mongolia
 List - NW China
 List - Russia
 Map - Central Asia
 Map - High Asia

Central Asian Ultras
Geography of Central Asia
Landforms of Central Asia